Serine/threonine-protein phosphatase 2A regulatory subunit B'' subunit gamma is an enzyme that in humans is encoded by the PPP2R3C gene.

References

Further reading